Wuhua County (Hakka: Ng-Fa) is a county under the jurisdiction of the prefecture-level city of Meizhou in the east of Guangdong Province, China.

Ethno-linguistic make-up

Wuhua is noted for its large Hakka population.

Administrative divisions 

The county is responsible for the administration of 16 towns with the seat of government located in Shuizhai.

 Zhuanshui	() 
 Tanxia 
 Guotian 
 Shuanghua	() 
 Meilin 
 Huayang	() 
 Huacheng 
 Zhoujiang 
 Shuizhai 
 Hedong 
 Qiling
 Changbu 
 Hengbei 
 Anliu 
 Mianyang
 Longcun

Climate

See also 
 List of township-level divisions of Guangdong
 Wuhua dialect

References

External links 
Official website of the Wuhua People's Government 

 
County-level divisions of Guangdong
Meizhou